Spirit Electricity is an EP by hardcore punk and reggae pioneers Bad Brains, released by SST in 1991. It was recorded live in concert in 1987 during the same tour that spawned the live albums The Youth Are Getting Restless and Live. The EP includes several live classics as well as the only officially available live version of the rare "Return to Heaven."

Track listing
Return to Heaven 
Let Me Help 
Day Tripper/She's a Rainbow
Banned in D.C. 
Attitude 
Youth Are Getting Restless

Personnel
Dr. Know – guitar
H.R. – vocals
Earl Hudson – drums
Darryl Jenifer – bass

References

Bad Brains EPs
1991 EPs
SST Records EPs